Stavros Spyrou Niarchos (3 July 1909 – 15 April 1996) was a Greek billionaire shipping tycoon. Starting in 1952, he had the world's biggest supertankers built for his fleet. Propelled by both the Suez Crisis and increasing demand for oil, he and rival Aristotle Onassis became giants in global petroleum shipping.

Niarchos was also a noted thoroughbred horse breeder and racer, several times the leading owner and number one on the French breed list.

Early life 
Stavros was born in Athens to a wealthy family, son of Spyros Niarchos and his wife, Eugenie Koumantaros, a rich heiress. His great-great-grandfather, Philippos Niarchos, a Greek shipping agent in Valletta, had married a Maltese woman, a daughter from a noble family in Malta, whose younger offspring had migrated to Greece to base themselves in a merchant business from Malta.

His parents were naturalized Americans who had owned a department store in Buffalo, New York, before returning to Greece, three months prior to his birth. They returned to Buffalo for a brief time and the young Stavros attended the Nardin Academy grammar school. They returned permanently to Greece and Stavros studied in the city's best private school before starting university. He studied law at the University of Athens, after which he went to work for his maternal uncles in the Koumantaros family's grain business. During this period, he became involved in shipping by convincing his uncles their firm would be more profitable if it owned its own ships.

Shipping career
Niarchos was a naval officer in World War II, during which time part of the trade fleet he had developed with his uncle was destroyed. He used about two million dollars in insurance settlement to build a new fleet. His most famous asset was the yacht Atlantis, currently known as Issham al Baher after having been gifted to King Fahd of Saudi Arabia.

He then founded Niarchos Ltd., an international shipping company that at one time operated more than 80 tankers worldwide. He and Aristotle Onassis were great shipping rivals. In 1952, high-capacity oil supertankers were built for the competing Niarchos and Onassis fleets, who both claimed to own the largest tanker in the world. Then the world's largest supertanker, it was named after Niarchos's second son, Spyros, born earlier that year.

In 1956, the Suez Canal Crisis considerably increased the demand for the type of large-tonnage ships that Niarchos owned. Business flourished and he became a billionaire.

Personal life

Marriages
Niarchos was married five times:

 To Helen Sporides in 1930, a daughter of Admiral Constantine Sporides, lasted one year.
 To Melpomene Capparis in 1939, a widow of a Greek diplomat, whom he divorced in 1947.
 To Eugenia Livanos in 1947, a daughter of shipping magnate Stavros G. Livanos. They divorced in 1965; she died in 1970 at the age of 44, after an overdose of barbiturates.
During this marriage he had an affair with Pamela Churchill (later Pamela Harriman).
 To Charlotte Ford in 1965, daughter of tycoon automaker Henry Ford II, in Mexico. Their daughter Elena Anne Ford was born six months later. When the marriage ended in divorce the following year Niarchos returned to his former wife, Eugenia. No remarriage was necessary, since the couple's 1965 Mexican divorce had not been recognized by Greek law.
 To Athina Mary Livanos, his third wife Eugenia's sister, in 1971. Then the Marchioness of Blandford, Athina had been the first wife of Aristotle Onassis. She died of an overdose in 1974.

From the late 1970s until his death, he was linked to Princess Firyal of Jordan. He was also said to be linked to Princess Maria Gabriella of Savoy.

Children
Niarchos had two daughters and three sons:

By his third wife, Eugenia Livanos, whom he never divorced under Greek law:
Maria Isabella Niarchos, a breeder of thoroughbreds. Married to Stephane Gouazé. Mother of two children: Artur Gouazé and Maia Gouazé
Philip, art collector. Married in 1984 to his third wife Victoria Guinness (b. 1960), who is the younger daughter of Patrick Benjamin Guinness and Baroness Dolores von Fürstenberg-Hedringen. They had four children together: Stavros Niarchos (b. 1985, husband of Dasha Zhukova), Eugenie Niarchos (b. 1986), Theodorakis Niarchos (b. 1991), Electra Niarchos (b. 1995). 
Spyros (b. 1955) married 1987 (divorced 1999) the Hon. Daphne Guinness (b. 1967), daughter of Jonathan Guinness, 3rd Baron Moyne by his second wife Suzanne Lisney, and had three children: Nicolas Stavros Niarchos (b. 1989), Alexis Spyros Niarchos (b. 1991) and Ines Niarchos (b. 1995). Spyros is a good friend of Prince Ernst August of Hanover, and was best man at his wedding to Princess Caroline of Monaco.
Konstantin, or Constantine Niarchos (1962–1999); married firstly 1987 (divorced) Princess Alessandra Borghese, no issue; married secondly the Brazilian artist Sylvia Martins, no issue. He was the first Greek to scale Mount Everest. At his death of a massive cocaine overdose in 1999, The Independent (UK) reported he had been left one billion dollars as his share of his late father's estate.
By his fourth wife; Charlotte Ford:
Elena Ford (b. 1966) married firstly 1991 (divorced) to Stanley Jozef Olender, married secondly 1996 Joseph Daniel Rippolone (divorced), with issue.

Death
Niarchos died in 1996, in Zurich. He is buried in the family tomb in the Bois-de-Vaux Cemetery in Lausanne. At his death, his fortune was estimated to be worth $12 billion. When Niarchos died, he left 20% of his fortune to a charitable trust to be established in his name and the other part to his three sons and daughter Maria by his marriage to Greek shipping heiress Eugenia Livanos, a nephew, and a great nephew. He notably excluded Elena Ford his daughter by his ex-wife Charlotte from his will. She sued the estate in both Swiss and Greek courts for her 1/10th share estimated to be worth £700 million.

Thoroughbred horse racing 
Niarchos began investing in thoroughbred horse racing in the early 1950s and won his first stakes race with Pipe of Peace at the Middle Park Stakes. After leaving the business for roughly two decades he came back in the 1970s and eventually put together a highly successful stable of racehorses that competed in France and the United Kingdom. He acquired the Haras de Fresnay-le-Buffard horse breeding farm in Neuvy-au-Houlme, France and Oak Tree Farm in Lexington, Kentucky where in 1984 he bred his most successful horse, Miesque. Niarchos was the leading owner in France twice (1983, 1984) and topped the breeders' list there three times (1989, 1993, 1994). His prize horses were all trained by François Boutin, whose skill was a vital element of Niarchos's success in the field.

After his death in 1996, his daughter Maria Niarchos-Gouazé took charge of racing operations. She too was successful, her colt Bago winning France's most important race, the Prix de l'Arc de Triomphe, in 2004, and her filly Divine Proportions capturing the 2005 Prix de Diane by winning 9 out of her 10 races until a serious tendon injury cut the horse's racing career short.

See also
Stavros Niarchos Foundation

Notes

References

External links 
 The Stavros Niarchos Foundation
 Niarchos Group
 Mentioned in Time's People section (Monday, Sep. 28, 1970)

1909 births
1996 deaths
Greek art collectors
Greek billionaires
Greek businesspeople in shipping
Greek expatriates in Switzerland
Greek racehorse owners and breeders
Greek people of Maltese descent
Livanos family
National and Kapodistrian University of Athens alumni
Niarchos family
Businesspeople from Athens
Recipients of the Order of the Phoenix (Greece)
Owners of Prix de l'Arc de Triomphe winners